Atashan (also Romanized as Ātashān, Āteshān, and Ateshun) is a village in Hablerud Rural District, in the Central District of Firuzkuh County, Tehran Province, Iran. At the 2006 census, its population was 748, in 238 families.

References 

Populated places in Firuzkuh County